Club Balonmano Antequera was a handball team based in Antequera, Andalusia. Its last season was 2011–12 in Liga ASOBAL finishing in 16th position at standings being consequently relegated.

The club was dissolved in June, 2012 due to an overall debt of €800,000.

Season by season

6 seasons in Liga ASOBAL

Notable players
 Rune Ohm
 Rade Mijatović
 Zoran Lubej
 Rajko Prodanović
 Božidar Markićević
 Rafael Baena
 Igor Bakić
 Obrad Radulović
 Jordi Nuñez
 Danimir Ćurković
 Srđan Trivundža
 Branislav Obradović
  Lazo Majnov

Stadium information
Name: - Fernando Argüelles
City: - Antequera
Capacity: - 2,575 people
Address: - C/ Antonio Mohedano, s/n

References

External links
BM Antequera Official Website

Sports teams in Andalusia
Spanish handball clubs
Handball clubs established in 1994
Sports clubs disestablished in 2012
1994 establishments in Spain
2012 disestablishments in Spain
Defunct handball clubs
Sport in Antequera